A Question of Sport: Super Saturday (often shortened to Super Saturday) is a British television programme which was a spin-off from the long-running quiz show A Question of Sport.

Super Saturday was hosted by comedian Jason Manford, with Helen Skelton on pre-recorded rounds, and began airing on 21 June 2014 on BBC One. The show received a large amount of negative reviews from critics and after just one series it was cancelled.

Production
The show was recorded at dock10, MediaCityUK on 5 and 6 June 2014, with more than one episode being recorded each day.

Episode Guide
The coloured backgrounds denote the result of each of the shows:

 – indicates Matt's team won.
 – indicates Phil's team won.

Criticism
The show received complaints over its similarity to the game show A League of Their Own and the fact that a large number of guests were all from BBC programmes. The show was largely panned by critics and was cancelled after just 1 series.

References

External links

2014 British television series debuts
2014 British television series endings
BBC panel games
2010s British game shows
British panel games
English-language television shows